The sandy ray (Leucoraja circularis) or sandy skate is a species of ray in the family Rajidae.

Description

It has a short snout with a spinulose reddish-brown dorsal surface, a tail only slightly longer than body, and a white underside. A distinctive feature is the 4–6 creamy-coloured spots on each wing.

Habitat

According to the FAO this species should be considered extinct in Mediterranean Sea, but recent records contradict this view.

Behaviour

The sandy ray lays its eggs between August and November and feeds on benthic invertebrates and small bony fish.

References
 

Leucoraja
Fish described in 1838